Sean Robert Tracy (born 7 June 1963, in Auckland), was a New Zealand cricketer who played for Auckland, Canterbury and Otago in the Plunket Shield.

See also
 List of Otago representative cricketers
 List of Auckland representative cricketers

External links
 Sean Tracy, from Cricinfo
 Sean Tracy, from Cricket Archive

1963 births
Living people
New Zealand cricketers
Auckland cricketers
Canterbury cricketers
Gloucestershire cricketers
Otago cricketers
Cricketers from Auckland